SS Tolten was a Chilean Cargo ship that was torpedoed by the German submarine U-404 in the Atlantic Ocean  off Barnegat, New Jersey, United States on 13 March 1942 while she was travelling from Baltimore, United States to New York City, New York (state), United States in ballast.

Construction 
Tolten was built at the Aalborg Værft A/S shipyard in Aalborg, Denmark in June 1938. This is where she was launched and completed that same year. Compound expansion steam engine and a L.P. turbine with SR driving a single screw propeller. The ship could generate 231 n.h.p. with a speed of 12.5 knots thanks to her two steam boilers.

Sinking 

The ship sank in six minutes and it was only after her sinking that the U-boat crew confirmed the ship to be Chilean.

All but one of her 27 crew died in the sinking. A fireman named Julio Faust Rivera was blown overboard by the torpedo impact and managed to swim to a loose raft before passing out. He was rescued 12 hours later by USS Larch and brought to the Marine Hospital at Stapleton, Staten Island. The sinking led to diplomatic tension between Chile and Germany with an unfavorable reaction from the Chilean foreign minister and anti-German demonstrations in Chile. Chile would sever relations with the Axis Powers the following year, declaring war on 
Germany and Italy but withholding declaring war on Japan until 1945.

Wreck 

References

1938 ships
Cargo ships
Maritime incidents in March 1942
Ships built in Aalborg
Steamships of Chile
World War II shipwrecks in the Atlantic Ocean
Ships sunk by German submarines in World War II